The 1st Aston Martin Owners Club Formula 2 Race was a motor race, run to Formula Two rules, held on 3 May 1952 at Snetterton Circuit, Norfolk. The race was run over 10 laps of the circuit, and was won by British driver Dickie Stoop in a Frazer Nash Mille Miglia. Cliff Davis in a Cooper T14-MG was second and Bobby Pattenden in an HWM-Alta was third. Charles Bulmer in a BMW Special set fastest lap.

Results

References

Aston Martin Owners Club F2 Race
Aston Martin Owners Club F2 Race
Aston Martin Owners Club F2 Race